Laaleys (Laalays) is a Village in south-central Sahil region in Somaliland.

History
Laaleys appears in a book published in 1951 in England under the name "Lalis".

In August 2021, the Government of Somaliland officially launched a major mineral exploration operation at Hudisa, Laalays and Lasadawo in Sahil region.

In October 2022, the Minister of Agricultural Development of Somaliland visits Laaleys.

Notable People
Maxamed Yuusuf Cabdi - Somali singer
Mohamed Sulayman Tubeec - Somali singer, songwriter

References

Populated places in Sahil, Somaliland